Albert Evans may refer to:

 Albert Evans (American football) (born 1989), American football safety
 Albert Evans (dancer) (1968–2015), American ballet dancer
 Albert Evans (footballer, born 1874) (1874–1966), footballer for Aston Villa, manager of Coventry City
 Albert Evans (footballer, born 1901) (1901–1969), footballer for Woking, Tottenham Hotspur and Grantham Town
 Albert Evans (politician) (1903–1988), British Labour Party politician
 Albert Evans (Welsh footballer), footballer for Cardiff City
 Albert S. Evans (died 1872), American explorer and writer

See also
 Bert Evans (disambiguation)
 Al Evans (1916–1979), baseball player